Daho may refer to:

People
 Daho Ould Kablia (born 1933), Algerian politician
 Najib Daho (1959–1993), English boxer
 Étienne Daho (born 1956), French singer

Places
 Daho, Burkina Faso
 Bago Daho, Pakistan
 Ouakpé-Daho, Benin

Other
 Daho-Doo language